Stauning Vestjylland Airport is an airport in Ringkøbing-Skjern Municipality, Denmark. 

It is located 4 km northwest of Stauning, 13 km northwest of Skjern and 16 km southeast of Ringkøbing.

The airport is home to the annual KZ Rally, a vintage aircraft and aviation fair where enthusiasts and collectors can show their planes.

Facilities
The airport has 1 check-in desk, 140 parking spaces (40 short term, 100 long term), a Bureau de Change, Travel agent, Car rental and there is a taxi rank at the airport.

References

http://www.azworldairports.com/airports/a1460sta.cfm

Airports in Denmark
Buildings and structures in the Central Denmark Region
Transport in the Central Denmark Region